Klemens of Brzeźnica (Polish: Klemens z Brzeźnicy, Klemens Klimontowic, Klemens Gryfita) was a Polish nobleman who served as the Voivode of Opole and later as Castellan of Kraków. He was ultimately killed at the Battle of Chmielnik on March 18, 1241, alongside his Włodzimierz, Voivode of Cracow.

Life 
He was born to a noble family of Gryfici (Świebodzice), son of the Castellan of Płock, who had 6 children. He fled Lesser Poland to Opole and Racibórz following the 1225 dispute between Henry the Bearded and Leszek the White over the duchy of Krakow. His father-in-law was the Opole Castellan Zbrosław, and he was appointed by Casimir I of Opole to be Voivode of Opole. He was to bear half the costs associated with the expansion of the Opole castle, a decision that was made in August of 1228 in Rybnik.

He returned to Lesser Poland and became Castellan of Kraków around 1230, during the reign of Władysław III Spindleshanks. He defended Krakow, Wawel and Skała, alongside the then Voivode Marek of Brzeźncia, from the Masovian army of Konrad I. He continued to serve as Castellan until his death in 1241.

He founded a Cistercian monastery in Łubnice and a Benedictine monastery in Staniątki, where his daughter Wyszeniega (Wizenna) was later a nun, and where Klement and his wife were buried.

One of his five brothers, Andrzej Gryfita, became the Bishop Płock in 1239.

References 

 Małecki A., Studya heraldyczne, Vol. II, Lwów 1890, pp. 54, 57.
 Wójcik L. M., Ród Gryfitów do końca XIII wieku. Pochodzenie — genealogia — rozsiedlenie, Wrocław 1993, pp. 44, 47-49.
 Zientara B., Henryk Brodaty i jego czasy, 3rd. edition, Warszawa 2006 

1190s births
1241 deaths
13th-century Polish nobility
Castellans of Kraków